The Ghindăoani gas field is a natural gas field located in Ghindăoani, Neamț County. It was discovered in 2000 and developed by and Aurelian Oil & Gas. It began production in 2006 and produces natural gas and condensates. The total proven reserves of the Ghindăoani gas field are around 115 billion cubic feet (3.3 km³), and production is slated to be around 4 million cubic feet/day (0.114×105m³) in 2010.

References

Natural gas fields in Romania